Marco Berlinghieri (fl. 1232–1255) was an Italian medieval miniature painter and book illuminator who executed an illuminated Bible, finished in 1250. He was the son of Berlinghiero Berlinghieri and the brother of Barone and Bonaventura Berlinghieri.

References

External links

13th-century Italian painters
Italian male painters
Gothic painters